Sir James Cotter, 1st Baronet (1714 – 9 June 1770) was an Irish politician and baronet.

Career 
Cotter was born into the Norse-Gaelic Cotter family, the son of James Cotter the Younger (1689–1720), a leading Roman Catholic and Jacobite in County Cork, by his marriage to Margaret Mathew. After his father's death, he was brought up by guardians as a Protestant and educated at Midleton College, a Church of Ireland boarding school in County Cork.

Cotter served as a Member of Parliament for Askeaton in the Irish House of Commons between 1761 and 1768. On 11 August 1763 he was created a baronet, of Rockforest in the County of Cork, in the Baronetage of Ireland.

In 1746 Cotter married Arabella Rogerson, daughter of  Sir John Rogerson, Lord Chief Justice of Ireland, and Elizabeth Ludlow. Arabella was the widow of William Casaubon. Together they had four children.

References

1714 births
1770 deaths
Baronets in the Baronetage of Ireland
James
Irish MPs 1761–1768
People from County Cork
Members of the Parliament of Ireland (pre-1801) for County Limerick constituencies
People educated at Midleton College